Periya is a small village in Thavinhal Gramapanchayath of Kerala state, India.

References 

Villages in Wayanad district